Portoscuso (Portescusi in Sardinian language) is a comune (municipality) in the Province of South Sardinia in the Italian region Sardinia, located about  west of Cagliari and about  northwest of Carbonia. The languages used here are Italian and Sardinian Campidanese.

Portoscuso borders the following municipalities: Carbonia, Gonnesa, and San Giovanni Suergiu.

History
Although human presence in this territory dates back to prehistoric times, the town originated in the 17th century from a hamlet inhabited by tuna and coral fishermen. Its name came from the Catalan Puerto Escos (hidden port). It became a comune in 1853.

Notable sights include the Spanish Tower (16th century), the church of Madonna d'Itria (17th century) and the Arsenal, known as Su Pranu (17th century).

The town is extremely proud of its famous tuna fishery, and is restoring the original buildings.

Economy
At Portoscuso, there is Sulcis Power Station, the largest power station of Sardinia, whose chimney is the tallest man-made structure on Sardinia.

Gallery

See also
 Portoscuso Wind Farm

References

External links

 Official website
 Tuttitalia

Cities and towns in Sardinia